The men's 110 metres hurdles at the 2016 European Athletics Championships took place at the Olympic Stadium on 8 and 9 July.

Records

Schedule

Results

Round 1

First 3 in each heat (Q) and the next fastest 4 (q) advance to the Semifinals. 12 fastest entrants awarded bye to Semifinals.

Wind:Heat 1: +0.3 m/s, Heat 2: -0.5 m/s, Heat 3: 0.0 m/s

Semifinals

First 2 in each heat (Q) and the next fastest 2 (q) advance to the Semifinals.

Wind:Heat 1: -0.6 m/s, Heat 2: -1.8 m/s, Heat 3: -0.5 m/s

*Athletes who received a bye to the semifinals

Final 
Wind: 0.0 m/s

References

External links
 amsterdam2016.org, official championship site.

Hurdles 110 M
Sprint hurdles at the European Athletics Championships